Stephanie Kurtzuba (born March 20, 1972) is an American film, television, and theater actress. She is best known for her roles in the films The Wolf of Wall Street (2013), Annie (2014), and The Irishman (2019), and on television in recurring roles on The Good Wife and Blue Bloods.

Early life and education
Kurtzuba was born and raised in Omaha, Nebraska, where she graduated from Omaha Central High School. Growing up, she performed in local theater productions, with her first role at the age of 10 as an orphan pickpocket in the musical Oliver, and won the Miss Nebraska Pre-Teen pageant. She briefly attended the University of Nebraska-Lincoln, where she studied journalism, before being accepted to New York University's Tisch School of the Arts, where she earned an acting degree.

Career

Theater
After graduating, she spent time performing in experimental off-off-Broadway productions, before going into commercial theater. Her first Broadway show was as part of a backup trio to Hugh Jackman in The Boy From Oz in 2003. As a member of the original Broadway casts of Mary Poppins in 2006 and Billy Elliot the Musical in 2008, she performed at the 2007 and 2009 Tony Awards. Her Off-Broadway credits include the 2018 revival of Stephen Adly Guirgis' Our Lady of 121st St., directed by Phylicia Rashad for Signature Theatre, The Joys of Sex, directed by Jeremy Dobrish for Variety Arts Theater, and Bat Boy: The Musical, directed by Scott Schwartz at the Union Square Theatre.

Film
Kurtzuba portrayed Mrs. Kovacevic, a social services clerk with a Russian accent, in the 2014 film adaptation of Annie. Her performance was praised in the Los Angeles Times and Variety. She is featured on the song "I Think I'm Gonna Like It Here" on the Annie soundtrack album. In The Wolf of Wall Street, directed by Martin Scorsese, she played Kimmie Belzer, a single mom hired by Jordan Belfort (Leonardo DiCaprio) and the only female stockbroker at the company. In the Scorsese Netflix film The Irishman, starring Al Pacino and Robert De Niro, she portrays Irene, the wife of De Niro's character. She also appeared in Extremely Loud & Incredibly Close and Away We Go opposite John Krasinski.

Television
Kurtzuba had recurring roles as Olivia on The Good Wife on CBS, as Sergeant (and later Captain) Paula McNichols on and Blue Bloods, as cult member Sabrina on The Leftovers on HBO, and on the Paramount Network miniseries Waco. She has also appeared on Law & Order: SVU on NBC, Elementary on CBS, and Bull on CBS.

Personal life
Kurtzuba married Joshua Coakley in 2005. They met when Kurtzuba was performing in a show at the Alley Theatre in Houston, and Coakley was working on the show in the props department. They live in New York City and have two sons.

Kurtzuba co-owns West Lanes Bowling Center in Omaha with her father and two siblings. Her maternal grandparents built the bowling alley in 1955.

Kurtzuba is also a model and has been the spokesperson for Red Baron Pizza since 2017.

Filmography

Film

Television

Broadway theater

References

External links
 Official website
 
 

1972 births
Living people
American people of Polish descent
University of Nebraska–Lincoln alumni
Tisch School of the Arts alumni
Actresses from Omaha, Nebraska
American film actresses
American television actresses
American stage actresses
21st-century American actresses
Omaha Central High School alumni